The 2016 United States Senate election in Nevada was held November 8, 2016 to elect a member of the United States Senate to represent the State of Nevada, concurrently with the 2016 U.S. presidential election, as well as other elections to the United States Senate in other states and elections to the United States House of Representatives and various state and local elections. The state primary election was held June 14, 2016.

Incumbent Democratic Senator Harry Reid, the Senate Minority Leader and former Senate Majority Leader, initially said he would seek re-election to a sixth term, but announced on March 26, 2015, that he would retire instead.

Former Democratic State Attorney General Catherine Cortez Masto defeated Republican U.S. Representative Joe Heck in the general election on November 8, 2016. Heck won sixteen of the state's seventeen counties; however, since Cortez Masto won Clark County, which comprises nearly three-quarters of the state's population, she defeated Heck statewide by almost 27,000 votes, and became the first female and first Latina Senator in Nevada's history.

As of 2022, this would be the last time Washoe County voted for a Republican Senate candidate.

Democratic primary

Candidates

Declared 
 Catherine Cortez Masto, former Nevada Attorney General
 Bobby Mahendra
 Liddo Susan O'Briant, instructional assistant
 Allen Rheinhart, Black Lives Matter activist and candidate for governor in 2014

Withdrew 
 Harry Reid, incumbent U.S. Senator

Declined 
 Shelley Berkley, former U.S. Representative and nominee for the U.S. Senate in 2012
 Lucy Flores, former state assemblywoman and nominee for lieutenant governor in 2014 (lost primary for NV-04)
 Steven Horsford, former U.S. Representative
 John Lee, Mayor of North Las Vegas, former state senator and candidate for NV-04 in 2012
 Kate Marshall, former state treasurer of Nevada, nominee for Nevada's 2nd congressional district in 2011 and nominee for Secretary of State of Nevada in 2014
 Ross Miller, former secretary of state of Nevada and nominee for Nevada Attorney General in 2014
 Rory Reid, former Clark County Commissioner, nominee for governor in 2010 and son of U.S. Senator Harry Reid
 Steve Sisolak, chairman of the Clark County Commission
 Dina Titus, U.S. Representative and nominee for Governor of Nevada in 2006 (running for re-election)

Democratic endorsements

Results

Republican primary

Candidates

Declared 
 Sharron Angle, former state assemblywoman, nominee for the U.S. Senate in 2010 and candidate for NV-02 in 2006
 D'Nese Davis, artist and teacher
 Eddie Hamilton, retired auto executive and perennial candidate
 Joe Heck, U.S. Representative
 Thomas "Sad Tom" Heck, retired air force officer
 Robert Leeds, author, retired Merchant Marine and perennial candidate
 Carlo "Mazunga" Poliak, retired sanitation worker and perennial candidate
 Juston Preble, sales consultant
 Bill Tarbell, retired minister and candidate for governor in 2014

Withdrawn 
 Bob Beers, Las Vegas City Councilman, former state senator and candidate for governor in 2006

Declined 
 Mark Amodei, U.S. Representative (running for re-election)
 Greg Brower, state senator and former United States Attorney for the District of Nevada
 Barbara Cegavske, Secretary of State of Nevada, former state senator and candidate for NV-04 in 2012
 Heidi Gansert, former state assemblywoman and former chief of staff to Governor Brian Sandoval
 Cresent Hardy, U.S. Representative (lost re-election to NV-04)
 Steve Hill, executive director of the Nevada Governor's Office of Economic Development
 Mark Hutchison, Lieutenant Governor of Nevada and former state senator
 Ron Knecht, Nevada State Controller, former regent of the University of Nevada, Reno and former state assemblyman
 Brian Krolicki, former lieutenant governor of Nevada
 Adam Laxalt, Nevada Attorney General
 Michael Roberson, Majority Leader of the Nevada Senate (running for NV-03)
 Wayne Allyn Root, former member of the Libertarian National Committee and Libertarian Party nominee for Vice President of the United States in 2008
 Brian Sandoval, Governor of Nevada
 Dan Schwartz, state treasurer and candidate for NV-04 in 2012

Endorsements

Polling

Results

Independent American primary

Candidates

Declared 
 Tom Jones, retired businessman and perennial candidate

Libertarian primary

Candidates

Declined 
 Dennis Hof, owner of the Moonlite Bunny Ranch (running for the State Senate)

Independents

Candidates

Declared 
 Tony Gumina, physician and businessman
 Tom Sawyer, retired railroad worker
 G.A. Villa (not on final ballot)
 Jarrod M. Williams, veteran

General election

Debates

Predictions

Polling

with Harry Reid

with Dina Titus

with Catherine Cortez Masto

Results 

Cortez Masto won her bid to succeed Harry Reid 47.10-44.67, or by 2.43%, running 0.01% better than Hillary Clinton.

By county

See also 
 Freedom Partners Action Fund
 2016 United States Senate elections
 2016 United States House of Representatives elections in Nevada
 2016 United States presidential election in Nevada

Notes

Partisan clients

References

External links 
Official campaign websites (Archived)
 Catherine Cortez Masto (D) for Senate
 Joe Heck (R) for Senate
 Tom Jones (IA) for Senate

2016
Nevada
United States Senate